G.I. Jane is a 1997 American action drama film directed by Ridley Scott and starring Demi Moore, Viggo Mortensen, and Anne Bancroft. The film tells the fictional story of the first woman to undergo special operations training similar to the U.S. Navy SEALs.

The film was produced by Largo Entertainment, Scott Free Productions, and Caravan Pictures, and distributed by Hollywood Pictures. It received mixed reviews, with Moore's performance receiving criticism and winning her the Razzie Award for Worst Actress. It performed moderately at the box office, grossing $48 million domestically and $97 million worldwide. The film also earned $22 million from home VHS/DVD sales.

Plot

A Senate Armed Services Committee interviews a candidate for the position of Secretary of the Navy. Senator Lillian DeHaven from Texas criticizes the Navy for not being gender-neutral. Behind the curtains, a deal is struck: If women compare favorably with men in a series of test cases, the military will integrate women fully into all occupations of the Navy.

The first test is the training course of the U.S. Navy Combined Reconnaissance Team (similar to the SEALs UDT/BUDs) Senator DeHaven selects topographical analyst Lieutenant Jordan O'Neil, because she is physically more feminine than the other candidates.

To make the grade, O'Neil must survive a grueling selection program in which almost sixty percent of candidates wash out, most before the fourth week, with the third week being particularly intensive ("hell week"). The enigmatic Command Master Chief John James Urgayle runs the training program that involves 20-hour days of tasks designed to wear down recruits' physical and mental strength, including pushing giant ship fenders up beach dunes, working through obstacle courses, and hauling landing rafts.

Given a 30-second "gender-norming" allowance in an obstacle course, O'Neil demands to be held to the same standards as the male trainees. The master chief observes O'Neil helping the other candidates by allowing them to climb on her back to make it over the wall obstacle course. Eight weeks into the program, during SERE training in Captiva, Florida, the Master Chief ties her to a chair with her hands behind her back, grabs hold of her and slams her through the door, then picking her up off the floor he repeatedly dunks her head in ice-cold water in front of the other crew members. O'Neil retaliates and is successful in causing him some injury, despite her immobilized arms. In so doing, she acquires respect from him, as well as from the other trainees.

Navy leaders, confident that a woman would quickly drop out, become concerned. The media learn of O'Neil's involvement, and she becomes a sensation known as "G.I. Jane." and "Joan of Arc". Soon, she must contend with trumped-up charges that she is a lesbian, and is fraternizing with women. O'Neil is told that she will be given a desk job during the investigation and, if cleared, will need to repeat her training from the beginning. She decides to "ring out" (ringing a bell three times, signaling her voluntary withdrawal from the program) rather than accept a desk job.

It is later revealed that the photo evidence of O'Neil's alleged fraternization came from Senator DeHaven's office. DeHaven never intended for O'Neil to succeed; she used O'Neil as a bargaining chip to prevent military base closings in her home state of Texas. O'Neil threatens to expose DeHaven, who then has the charges voided and O'Neil restored to the program.

The final phase of training, an operational readiness exercise, is interrupted by an emergency that requires the CRT trainees' support. The situation involves a reconnaissance satellite powered by weapons-grade plutonium that fell into the Libyan desert. A team of U.S. Army Rangers is dispatched to retrieve the plutonium, but their evacuation plan fails, and the trainees are sent to assist the Rangers. The Master Chief's shooting of a Libyan soldier to protect O'Neil leads to a confrontation with a Libyan patrol. During the mission, O'Neil, using her experience as a topographical analyst, realizes when she sees the team's map that the Master Chief is not going to use the route the others believe he will in regrouping with the others. She also displays a definitive ability in leadership and strategy while rescuing the injured Master Chief, whom she and McCool pull out of an explosives-laden "kill zone." With helicopter gunships delivering the final assault to the defenders, the rescue mission is a success.

Upon their return, all those who participated in the mission are accepted to the CRT. Urgayle gives O'Neil his Navy Cross and a book of poetry containing a short poem, "Self-pity", by D. H. Lawrence, as acknowledgment of her accomplishment and in gratitude for rescuing him.

Cast

Release

Release of G.I. Jane had been delayed by a week by Buena Vista Pictures and the film opened up against the comedy Money Talks from New Line Cinema. Both studios predicted their film would earn $11.1 million and be number 1 at the box office.
Buena Vista held sneak previews to generate positive word of mouth for the film. Phil Barlow, president of distribution for Buena Vista, said: "We knew from the research that people loved the movie". He further said: "All we had to do was get them in." Variety attributed audience reticence to the declining popularity of actress Demi Moore.

Reception

Box office
G.I. Jane in the U.S opened at number one, grossing $11 million in its opening weekend, playing at a total of 1,945 theaters. In its second weekend, the film stayed at number one, grossing $10.1 million. In the end the film played in a widest release of 2,043 theaters and grossed $48.1 million domestically, falling slightly short of its $50 million production budget.

Critical response
On Rotten Tomatoes, the film has an approval rating of 53% based on reviews from 38 critics, with an average rating of 5.7/10. The site's critical consensus was: "Demi Moore admirably does her duty, but G.I. Jane'''s well-intentioned message is obscured by stylistic bombast and an overload of jingoism." On Metacritic, the film has a score of 62 out of 100 based on reviews from 21 critics, indicating "generally favorable reviews". Audiences surveyed by CinemaScore gave the film a grade "A−" on scale of A to F.

Todd McCarthy of Variety called it "A very entertaining get-tough fantasy with political and feminist underpinnings."
Roger Ebert of the Chicago Sun-Times wrote: "The training sequences are as they have to be: incredible rigors, survived by O'Neil. They are good cinema because Ridley Scott, the director, brings a documentary attention to them, and because Demi Moore, having bitten off a great deal here, proves she can chew it."
Owen Gleiberman of Entertainment Weekly wrote: "Were women put on earth to be warriors? Demi Moore certainly was. The role of Jordan fits her as snugly as a new layer of muscle."

Deborah Brown of Empire magazine wrote: "In spite of a catalogue of downsides, including clunky dialogue, fuzzy morals and preposterous story lines, G.I. Jane does offer a perverse level of enjoyment."

About Demi Moore’s performance, G.I. Jane screenwriter, David Twohy, tells Yahoo Entertainment: "It's the performance of her career. The movie rises or falls on her performance, and that required her to have a total, unflinching commitment to that part. And she had that commitment — I think she f***ing nailed it." About the critical and box-office’s reception, Twohy added: "Striptease came out while we were in production, and the stink was in the air. I don't think it was fairly received, and Striptease had a lot to do with it, because it was a truly bad movie. She should have been nominated for G.I. Jane, and I think she would have been, too, if not for Striptease. That tainted her chances and maybe everyone's chances."

Accolades
Demi Moore won the Razzie Award for Worst Actress for her performance in the film. Viggo Mortensen was nominated for Worst Fake Accent at the 1997 Stinkers Bad Movie Awards but lost to Jon Voight for Anaconda and Most Wanted.

Home mediaG.I. Jane'' was released on VHS and DVD on April 22, 1998. The only extra feature was a theatrical trailer. It was released on Blu-ray on April 3, 2007, with no extra features aside from trailers for other movies. The film was also released on LaserDisc; this release featured an audio commentary by director Ridley Scott. The film grossed $22,122,300 in rentals.

See also
 Military-entertainment complex
 List of films featuring the United States Navy SEALs
 United States Navy SEAL selection and training#Women
 "G.I. Jane 2", a professed sequel by Chris Rock during the 94th Academy Awards

References

External links

 
 
 
 
 

1997 films
1990s action films
American political thriller films
American war drama films
1990s feminist films
Films directed by Ridley Scott
Hollywood Pictures films
Golden Raspberry Award winning films
Caravan Pictures films
Scott Free Productions films
Largo Entertainment films
Fictional women soldiers and warriors
Women in the United States Navy
Films produced by Demi Moore
Films shot in Virginia
Films shot in Washington, D.C.
Films shot in South Carolina
Films shot in Jacksonville, Florida
Films about United States Navy SEALs
Films produced by Roger Birnbaum
Films with screenplays by David Twohy
Films scored by Trevor Jones
1990s political films
Films produced by Suzanne Todd
American feminist films
1990s English-language films
1990s American films